Calamagrostis purpurea is a species of grass in the family Poaceae.

Its native range is Subarctic and Subalpine.

References

purpurea